Koubek (feminine Koubková) is a Czech surname. Notable people with the surname include:

 František Koubek, Czech footballer
 Greg Koubek, American basketball player
 Miroslav Koubek, Czech football manager
 Stefan Koubek (born 1977), Austrian tennis player
 Tomáš Koubek, Czech footballer
 Vlastimil Koubek (1927–2003), Czech-American architect
 Zdena Koubková, Czech athlete

Czech-language surnames